Gannon v. Kansas is a case before the Kansas Supreme Court concerning state funding for elementary and secondary schools. A group of school districts filed a suit against the State of Kansas in 2010. The case went to trial in 2012 and since then the Court has repeatedly ruled that the Kansas Legislature has inadequately and inequitably funded public schools in violation of Article 6 of the Kansas Constitution.

References 

Kansas state case law
Kansas Supreme Court
Public education in Kansas
Education finance in the United States
Separation of powers
Law articles needing an infobox